Vanderwhacker Mountain is a  mountain in the Adirondack Mountains region of New York. It is located northeast of Indian Lake and southeast of Newcomb in Essex County. The Vanderwhacker Mountain Fire Observation Station is located on top of the mountain. In May 1911, the Conservation Commission built a wooden fire observation tower on the mountain which was replaced in 1918, with a  metal tower. The tower stopped fire watching operations at the end of the 1988 season.

History
In May 1911, the Conservation Commission built a wooden fire observation tower on the mountain. In 1918, the Conservation Commission replaced it with a  Aermotor LS40 tower. The tower stopped fire watching operations at the end of the 1988 season. The tower was officially closed by the New York State Department of Environmental Conservation in early 1989.

External links
 The Fire Towers of New York

References

Adirondacks
Tourist attractions in Essex County, New York
Mountains of Essex County, New York
Mountains of New York (state)